Nițchidorf (literally "Niczky's village"; ; , originally Kutas) is a commune in Timiș County, Romania. It is composed of three villages: Blajova, Duboz and Nițchidorf (commune seat).

Geography 
The commune totals an area of 6,412 ha, of which 5,398 agricultural land and 1,014 non-agricultural land. It is located in the plain area of Timiș County, in the hydrographic basin of the Timiș River, bordering Caraș-Severin County and the hilly area on the river corridor.

History 
Traces of a fortress were discovered on the nearby Schlossberg ("Castle Hill"). In 1410 it appears as an annex of the parish of Duboz. During the Turkish occupation of Banat (1552–1718), the locality disappeared.

The current village was founded in 1784–1786 during the third wave of colonization of Banat, under Emperor Joseph II. At first, only 200 families were settled here. The origin of the settlers was from Lorraine, Alsace, Swabia, Luxembourg, Schwarzwald, Silesia, etc. Later came settlers from today's Hungary and Bohemia. It was named after Count Kristóf Niczky, the then prefect who took care of its colonization. So it was called Niczkydorf or "Niczky's village". The Romanians from the neighboring villages called it Nichișoara, and today's name is the Romanianized form of the original one.

For two centuries it was an almost exclusively German, Roman Catholic village. The Swabians built the Roman Catholic church in 1825. There was also a mill, which burned down in 1930. After the union of Banat with Romania, the village remained German. The exodus of the Germans began after World War II and accelerated in the late 1980s and early 1990s. Today, Nițchidorf is mostly Romanian.

Demographics 

Nițchidorf had a population of 1,523 inhabitants at the 2011 census, down 4% from the 2002 census. Most inhabitants are Romanians (88.77%), larger minorities being represented by Ukrainians (3.22%), Hungarians (1.71%) and Germans (1.38%). For 4.4% of the population, ethnicity is unknown. By religion, most inhabitants are Orthodox (84.24%), but there are also minorities of Roman Catholics (3.48%), Baptists (3.02%), Adventists (2.63%) and Pentecostals (1.12%). For 4.46% of the population, religious affiliation is unknown.

Notable people 
 Sebastian Kräuter (1922–2008), Roman Catholic bishop
  (b. 1950), writer, translator and journalist
 Herta Müller (b. 1953), writer and recipient of the 2009 Nobel Prize in Literature

References 

Communes in Timiș County
Localities in Romanian Banat
Former Danube Swabian communities in Romania